The Institute of Chartered Accountants of Namibia (ICAN) is a professional accountancy body in  Namibia.  It is the sole organisation in Namibia with the right to award the Chartered Accountant designation.

ICAN is a member of the International Federation of Accountants (IFAC).
ICAN was a charter member of the Pan African Federation of Accountants, which was inaugurated on 5 May 2011.

References

External links
Official homepage

Member bodies of the International Federation of Accountants